Enteromius aloyi is a species of ray-finned fish in the genus Enteromius. It is known only from its type locality on the Ntem River, Equatorial Guinea.

The fish is named in honor of Isidro Aloy (b. 1925) a Spanish biologist, who taught mathematics as a missionary.

Footnotes

References
Hayes, Malorie M., and Jonathan W. Armbruster. “The Taxonomy and Relationships of the African Small Barbs (Cypriniformes: Cyprinidae).” Copeia 105, no. 2 (2017): 348–62. https://www.jstor.org/stable/26872438.

Lévêque, C. and J. Daget, 1984. Cyprinidae. p. 217-342. In J. Daget, J.-P. Gosse and D.F.E. Thys van den Audenaerde (eds.) Check-list of the freshwater fishes of Africa (CLOFFA). ORSTOM, Paris and MRAC, Tervuren. Vol. 1. (Ref. 2801)

Enteromius
Taxa named by Benigno Román
Fish described in 1971